Berzelius is a secret society at Yale University named for the Swedish scientist Jöns Jakob Berzelius, considered one of the founding fathers of modern chemistry.  Founded in 1848, 'BZ', as  the society is called often, is the third oldest society at Yale and the oldest of those of the now-defunct Sheffield Scientific School, the institution which from 1854 to 1956 was the sciences and engineering college of Yale University. Berzelius became a senior society in the tradition of Skull and Bones, Scroll and Key, and Wolf's Head  in 1933 when the Sheffield Scientific School was integrated into Yale University. Book and Snake and St. Elmo, also societies from Sheffield, followed suit. Skull and Bones, founded in 1832, Scroll and Key, founded in 1841, and Wolf's Head, founded in 1883, catered to students in the Academic Department, or liberal arts college.

The alumni trust organization, the Colony Foundation, owns the society's building.  Outsiders refer to the building as a 'tomb', the customary appellation for a secret society structure at Yale; however, many BZ members refer to their building as "The Hall." This is likely a transferred linguistic remnant of the tradition of the 'Sheff' secret societies, which had 'halls' for residential use and 'tombs' as separate meeting places, in contrast to the Yale College senior secret societies, which maintained only "tombs."

Architects of Berzelius Buildings 
Donn Barber.  (1908 or 1910, current society building.  Style likened to "blank cube" but with classical ornamentation.) 
Henry Bacon and James Brite.  (completed 1898, residential building, nonextant, brick Neo-Renaissance-style dormitory.  Bacon was an American Beaux-Arts architect best remembered for his severe Greek Doric Lincoln Memorial in Washington, D.C. (built 1915–1922), which was his final project.  Yale purchased the building in 1933 for student housing and later used it for faculty offices. The building was demolished in 1969 to make way for the construction of the Yale Health Services Center, 17 Hillhouse Avenue.

Architectural historian Patrick L. Pinnell notes in  Yale University that Berzelius sold to the Scroll and Key Society the site on which the latter erected its own tomb.

Architectural historian Scott Meacham cites both Berzelius buildings in his study of Yale and Dartmouth society and fraternity architecture.

The original building was built to resemble a Greek temple. The surviving ca. 1908-10 building's location, set off from the more active center of Yale's campus, lends privacy to Berzelius' members, and its unadorned largely blank exterior conveys to outsiders the deceptive sense that nothing much happens inside. In addition to the meeting room, dining area, and numerous study rooms, there are below-ground activity rooms with a pool table and ping pong table for recreation. BZ recently underwent a major restoration.

Mission
The society takes its intellectual mission very seriously, invoking Socrates' exhortation "The unexamined life is not worth living” as well as stating to its prospective members that: "Berzelius provides opportunities for achieving insights through an open, honest exchange of experiences, passions, and opinions. This process prepares its members — whose diversity is highly valued — for an active, intellectually vigorous, and moral life, giving them a place and time for contemplation and reflection so that they might rise boldly to the challenges of their lives, devoted to good character, tolerant of others, and willing to serve their communities, while forging links of mind to mind in a chain unbroken."

See also
Collegiate secret societies in North America
Manuscript Society
Book and Snake
Aurelian Honor Society

References

External links 
 Yale's Fraternities, Sororities and Societies

Culture of Yale University
Secret societies at Yale
Student organizations established in 1848
1848 establishments in Connecticut